DNA-binding protein inhibitor ID-2 is a protein that in humans is encoded by the ID2 gene.

Function 

The protein encoded by this gene belongs to the inhibitor of DNA binding (ID) family, members of which are transcriptional regulators that contain a helix-loop-helix (HLH) domain but not a basic domain. Members of the ID family inhibit the functions of basic helix-loop-helix transcription factors in a dominant-negative manner by suppressing their heterodimerization partners through the HLH domains. This protein may play a role in negatively regulating cell differentiation. A pseudogene has been identified for this gene.
A research published by "Nature" in 01/2016, authored by Italian researchers Antonio Iavarone and Anna Lasorella, from Columbia University, states that ID2 protein has a relevant role in the development and resistance to therapies of glioblastoma, the most aggressive of brain cancers.

Interactions 

ID2 has been shown to interact with MyoD and NEDD9.

See also 
 Inhibitor of DNA-binding protein

References

Further reading

External links 
 
 

Transcription factors